Romain Fleurier (born 17 March 1997) is a French professional footballer who plays as a defender for  club Sedan.

Club career
Fleurier trained with Beauvais, and was recruited by Chambly in the summer of 2018 to play with the B team in Championnat National 3. When the senior team were promoted to Ligue 2 at the end of the 2018–19 season, Fleurier started training with the senior squad, being the only member of the group on an amateur contract. He made his Ligue 2 debut with the Chambly first team in a 2–0 loss to AC Ajaccio on 29 November 2019.

In May 2020, Fleurier signed with Championnat National side Villefranche. On 20 June 2021, he moved to Bourg-en-Bresse.

On 9 June 2022, Fleurier agreed to join Sedan.

References

External links
 
 

1997 births
Living people
French footballers
Association football defenders
FC Chambly Oise players
AS Beauvais Oise players
FC Villefranche Beaujolais players
Football Bourg-en-Bresse Péronnas 01 players
CS Sedan Ardennes players
Ligue 2 players
Championnat National players
Championnat National 2 players
Championnat National 3 players